Wera Liessem (23 April 1913 – 11 September 1991) was a German actress. She appeared in thirteen films between 1932 and 1955.

Filmography

References

External links

1913 births
1991 deaths
German film actresses
Actresses from Hamburg